Anthony John Sheehan (born 24 December 1948) is a former Australian politician. He obtained an economics degree at La Trobe University and was a school teacher at Heidelberg High School. He was elected branch secretary of the Victorian Secondary Teachers Association.

He was a member of the Victorian Legislative Assembly from the seat of Ivanhoe (1982–85) and Northcote (1988–98). He was a member of the ALP.

He held a number of ministerial positions in the  government of Joan Kirner. He was the Minister for Housing and Construction in 1990–91. He was then appointed the Minister for Finance in 1991–92 and  Treasurer from January to October 1992 when the Kirner government was defeated. He resigned from parliament in 1998 and was succeeded in his seat by Mary Delahunty.

References

External links
 Tony Sheehan bio

1948 births
Living people
Members of the Victorian Legislative Assembly
Australian Labor Party members of the Parliament of Victoria
Australian schoolteachers
La Trobe University alumni
Treasurers of Victoria
Politicians from Melbourne